Barry Rothwell (born 18 August 1939) is an Australian cricketer. He played 36 first-class matches for New South Wales between 1963/64 and 1968/69.

See also
 List of New South Wales representative cricketers

References

External links
 

1939 births
Living people
Australian cricketers
New South Wales cricketers
Cricketers from Sydney